Illinka may refer to several places in Ukraine:

Illinka, Krasnoperekopsk Raion, Crimea, village in Krasnoperekopsk Raion
Illinka, Saky Raion, Crimea, village in Saky Raion
Illinka, Kamianske Raion, Dnipropetrovsk Oblast, village in Kamianske Raion
Illinka, Nikopol Raion, Dnipropetrovsk Oblast, village in Nikopol Raion
Illinka, Horlivka Raion, Donetsk Oblast, rural settlement in Horlivka Raion
Illinka, Kurakhove urban hromada, Pokrovsk Raion, Donetsk Oblast, urban-type settlement in Pokrovsk Raion
Illinka, Marinka urban hromada, Pokrovsk Raion, Donetsk Oblast, village in Pokrovsk Raion
Illinka, Kherson Oblast, rural settlement in Kakhovka Raion
Illinka, Antratsyt Raion, Luhansk Oblast, village in Antratsyt Raion
Illinka, Svatove Raion, Luhansk Oblast, village in Svatove Raion
Illinka, Odesa Oblast, village in Odesa Raion